Golden Smog is an alternative country-rock supergroup of loosely connected musicians mostly from the Minneapolis area. At various times, members of Soul Asylum, The Replacements, Wilco, The Jayhawks, Run Westy Run, The Honeydogs and Big Star have worked with Golden Smog. Given the fluid collaborative nature of Golden Smog the lineup has often changed, but relative constants who appear on all the recordings are guitarists Kraig Johnson (Run Westy Run), Dan Murphy (Soul Asylum) and Gary Louris (The Jayhawks), along with bassist Marc Perlman (The Jayhawks).

The group took their name from a nickname given to Fred Flintstone in The Flintstones episode "Hot Lips Hannigan", which, in turn, was a parody of singer Mel Tormé's nickname (The Velvet Fog).

History

Pre-history: The Take It To The Limit Band (1987) and Her Satanic Majesty's Paycheck (1989)
The definitive beginning of Golden Smog is hard to pinpoint given the mercurial nature of the band's lineup.  However, some claim that the group that would evolve into Golden Smog debuted in January 1987, when a band billed as "The Take It To The Limit Band" played an (almost) all-Eagles cover show at the Uptown Bar in Minneapolis.  This band consisted of Dan Murphy and Dave Pirner (both of Soul Asylum), Jim Boquist (later of Son Volt), and Martin Zellar (Gear Daddies).  The show ended with a cover of then Bangles hit song "Walk Like an Egyptian."  This same group later played a Rolling Stones-themed show in 1989 under the band name "Her Satanic Majesty's Paycheck."

First incarnation (1989–1998)
The group first came together under the name "Golden Smog" in the Minneapolis area in 1989.  The band was conceived as a country-rock reaction to the punk and hardcore music that dominated the Twin Cities' musical scene at the time.  Eventually Golden Smog became something of a fixture at local clubs, where they would play a handful of shows annually, consisting almost entirely of cover songs.

Membership in the early days of the band was loose and fluid, but in 1992, Dan Murphy and Dave Pirner of Soul Asylum, Gary Louris and Marc Perlman of The Jayhawks, Kraig Johnson of Run Westy Run, and drummer Chris Mars (of The Replacements) released Golden Smog's first CD, a covers EP entitled On Golden Smog.  All of the band members were credited under pseudonyms for this release as a result of contractual obligations to other record companies. Over the next few years, members of Golden Smog began adding original material to the group's repertoire, although cover songs would continue to be featured in concert and on record throughout their career.

In 1995, the group released its full-length debut, Down by the Old Mainstream (recorded at Pachyderm Recording Studio), consisting of mostly original songs, with a handful of covers.  By this time, Mars had left Golden Smog and the band consisted of Johnson, Murphy, Louris, and Perlman, along with two new members:  Wilco frontman Jeff Tweedy and Honeydogs drummer Noah Levy.  As with the band's debut EP, all of the band members were credited under pseudonyms (which consisted of their middle names and the names of the streets where they grew up) as performers—although they all used their real names in the writing credits.

At a New Year's Eve show in 1996/97 Jody Stephens (of Big Star) took over for Noah on the drums, and subsequently became a full band member.  Golden Smog then released their second full-length studio album Weird Tales in 1998, with all band members credited under their real names as both writers and performers.

Second incarnation (2005–2007)
After a period of inactivity, in 2005 a new incarnation of Golden Smog formed and recorded the Another Fine Day album in the village of El Puerto de Santa María, Spain, produced by Paco Loco.  At this point the band consisted of Johnson, Louris, Murphy and Perlman; guest performers on several tracks included Tweedy, Spanish female vocalist Muni Camón, drummers Linda Pitmon and Jody Stephens, and multi-instrumentalist Ed Ackerson.

In the summer of 2006, the Johnson/Louris/Murphy/Perlman version of Golden Smog undertook a concert tour, augmented by a touring keyboardist and drummer.  This same line-up of the band then issued Blood on the Slacks in 2007; with no permanent drummer, various drummers filled the position on this disc, including Pitmon, Ackerson, Peter Anderson and even Marc Perlman.

Third incarnation (2019-2022)
Golden Smog reunited on July 12, 2019 to play a small "surprise" performance celebrating Dan Murphy's 57th birthday.  This show marked Murphy's first public musical performance since his retirement from Soul Asylum in 2012.  Murphy was joined onstage by Johnson, Louris, and Perlman as well as Miles Zuniga of the band Fastball.

A performance was scheduled for April 4, 2020, at First Avenue in Minneapolis. This show was postponed due to COVID-19 concerns. The band is now scheduled to reunite at First Avenue on April 2, 2022 with Jeff Tweedy and Jody Stephens both rejoining the band.

Discography

EPs
 On Golden Smog (1992) – A covers EP.

Albums
 Down by the Old Mainstream (1995)
 Weird Tales (1998)
 Another Fine Day (2006)
 Blood on the Slacks (2007)

Compilation albums
 Stay Golden, Smog: The Best Of Golden Smog—The Rykodisc Years (2008)

Compilation appearances
"Shooting Star" (From On Golden Smog) on the Clerks soundtrack (1994)
"Prison Wife" on Minnesota Modern Rock: The Pachyderm Sessions, (1995). Previously unreleased song
"Looking Forward to Seeing You" (From Weird Tales) on the Alt.Country Exposed Roots compilation album (1999)
"Looking Forward to Seeing You" (From Weird Tales) on the Rykodisc 20th Anniversary compilation album (2004)

References

External links
 Official MySpace Page For Stay Golden, Smog: The Best Of Golden Smog -- The Rykodisc Years
 
 Country Standard Time Feature story and reviews of Golden Smog

Rock music groups from Minnesota
Musical collectives
Rykodisc artists
Lost Highway Records artists
American supergroups
Musical groups established in 1989
Wilco
Musical groups from the Twin Cities